Sailboat is the fifth studio album (sixth overall) released by the singer-songwriter Jonathan Edwards.

Track listing 
All tracks composed by Jonathan Edwards, except where indicated.
 "Blow on Chilly Wind" (Jesse Winchester) – 3:16
 "Evangelina"  (Hoyt Axton, Kenneth Higginbotham) – 3:40
 "Sailboat" – 3:03
 "People Get Ready"  (Curtis Mayfield) – 3:00
 "How About You"  (Jesse Winchester) – 3:24
 "Girl from the Canyon" – 2:34
 "Weapon of Prayer"  (Ira Louvin, Charlie Louvin) – 3:23
 "Never Together (But Close Sometimes)"  (Rodney Crowell) – 2:06
 "Carolina Caroline" – 3:13
 "Let the Rough Side Drag" (Jesse Winchester) – 2:59

Personnel
Jonathan Edwards – lead vocals, acoustic guitar, backing vocals
Albert Lee, Brian Ahern – electric guitar
Brian Ahern, Emmylou Harris, Rodney Crowell – acoustic guitar
Emory Gordy, Jr. – bass
Hank DeVito – steel guitar
Mike Auldridge – resonator guitar
Herb Pedersen – banjo
Albert Lee – mandolin
Glen Hardin – keyboards
John Ware – percussion
Dianne Brooks, Emmylou Harris, Herb Pedersen – backing vocals
Richard Greene – strings
Technical
Bradley Hartman, Brian Ahern, Donivan Cowart, Miles Wilkinson, Stuart Taylor - "technical talent"
Tom Wilkes - artwork

1977 albums
Jonathan Edwards (musician) albums
Albums produced by Brian Ahern (producer)
Warner Records albums